Athos Chrysostomou (born August 6, 1981) is a Cypriot football goalkeeper who plays for Girne Halk Evi of KTFF 1. Lig . His former teams were Egaleo, AEL Limassol, Alki Larnaca, Ethnikos Achna, Ayia Napa, Ermis Aradippou and AEZ Zakakiou.

External links
 
 Athos Chrysostomou at KTFF

1981 births
Living people
Cypriot footballers
Association football goalkeepers
AEL Limassol players
Alki Larnaca FC players
Ermis Aradippou FC players
Egaleo F.C. players
Ethnikos Achna FC players
Ayia Napa FC players
AEZ Zakakiou players
Onisilos Sotira players
Sportspeople from Limassol